Fierbinți-Târg is a town in Ialomița County, Muntenia, Romania. The town administers three villages: Fierbinții de Jos, Fierbinții de Sus, and Grecii de Jos.

The commune is located in the western part of the county, bordering on Ilfov County.

Las Fierbinți, one of Romania's best known television series, is filmed in the town.

References

Populated places in Ialomița County
Localities in Muntenia
Towns in Romania